The National Order of Precedence in the Republic of Korea is a list of the symbolic hierarchy of officials incumbent and former, and other important figures used to direct protocol at state events. Unlike many countries, South Korean order of precedence is not formally regulated by single law or decree, but derived by convention and customary practices; the Ministry of Interior and Safety maintains codified version, the Ministry of Foreign Affairs, the Military, and the National Police have their respective versions in practice for their respective purposes.

The order starts with the President of the Republic, the head of the state and continues with figures in the legislative, the judicial and the executive branches of the state, in consideration of the separation of powers.

Detailed order
 President of the Republic of Korea
 Speaker of the National Assembly
 Chief Justice of the Supreme Court and President of the Constitutional Court
 Prime Minister
 Chairperson of the National Election Commission
 Chair of the Board of Audit and Inspection
 Leaders of the parties represented in the National Assembly
 Leader of the ruling party
 Leaders of the oppositions
 Deputy Speakers of the National Assembly (2)
 Cabinet ministers (17)
 Deputy Prime Ministers (2)
 Minister of Economy and Finance (Deputy Prime Minister of Economy ex officio)
 Minister of Education (Deputy Prime Minister of Social Affairs ex officio)
 Other ministers of the Cabinet (15)
 Minister of Foreign Affairs
 Minister of Reunification of Korea
 Minister of Justice
 Minister of National Defense
 Minister of Interior and Safety
 Minister of Culture, Sports and Tourism
 Minister of Agriculture, Food and Rural Affairs
 Minister of Trade, Industry and Energy
 Minister of Health and Welfare
 Minister of Environment
 Minister of Employment and Labor
 Minister of Gender Equality and Family
 Minister of Land, Infrastructure and Transport
 Minister of Oceans and Fisheries
 Minister of Small Businesses and Startups
 Floor leaders in the National Assembly
 Floor leader of the ruling party
 Floor leaders of the oppositions
 Chairs of the standing committees of the National Assembly (18)
 Chair of the House Steering Committee
 Chair of the Legislation and Judiciary Committee
 Chair of the National Policy Committee
 Chair of the National Strategy and Finance Committee
 Chair of the Education Committee
 Chair of the Science, Technology, Broadcasting and Communications Committee
 Chair of the Foreign Affairs and Reunification Committee
 Chair of the National Defense Committee
 Chair of the Public Administration and Security Committee
 Chair of the Culture, Sports and Tourism Committee
 Chair of the Agriculture, Food, Rural Affairs, Oceans and Fisheries Committee
 Chair of the Trade, Industry, Energy, Small Businesses and Startups Committee
 Chair of the Health and Welfare Committee
 Chair of the Environment and Labor Committee
 Chair of the Land, Infrastructure and Transport Committee
 Chair of the Intelligence Committee
 Chair of the Gender Equality and Family Committee
 Chair of the Special Committee on Budget and Accounts
 Justices of the Supreme Court and Justices of the Constitutional Court (8) (each In seniority of tenure)
 Chiefs of agencies reporting to the Presidents (5)
 Director of the National Intelligence Service
 Chief Presidential Secretary
 Chair of the National Security Council
 Commissioner of the Broadcasting and Telecommunication
 Chief of the Presidential Security Service
 Prosecutor General
 Chief of the National Assembly Secretariat
 Chiefs of agencies reporting to the Prime Minister (9)
 Chair of the Joint Chiefs of Staff
 Chief of Staff of the Armed Forces (3)
 Chief of Staff of the Army
 Chief of Staff of the Navy
 Chief of Staff of the Air Force
 Operation commanders (In seniority of tenure)
 Deputy Commander of ROK-US Combined Forces Command
 Ground Operations Commander
 Second Operations Commander
 Commander of the Marine Corps
 Members of the National Assembly (In seniority of tenure)

References 

Orders of precedence
Politics of South Korea
Government of South Korea